The 1935 Estonian Football Championship was the 15th official football league season in Estonia. Eight teams, five from Tallinn, one from Pärnu, Narva and Tartu, took part in the league. JS Estonia Tallinn successfully defended the title, winning the league for the second time in their short history.

League table

Results

Top scorers

References

Estonian Football Championship
1
Estonia
Estonia